Saphenista subsphragidias is a species of moth of the family Tortricidae. It is found in Tungurahua Province, Ecuador.

The wingspan is about 21 mm. The ground colour of the forewings is creamy white with yellowish-creamy suffusions and some brownish dots. The hindwings are white creamy, tinged with yellowish at the apex.

References

Moths described in 2002
Saphenista